INS Sindhudurg (K72) was the lead ship of the Durg class corvettes of the Indian Navy. It is the second of the three Nanuchka class missile corvettes procured from the former USSR.

The ship was commissioned on 29 May 1977 and decommissioned on 24 September 2004 after 27 years of service. The ship has the distinction of bringing down a surface-to-air missile during an exercise.

References 

Durg-class corvettes
Corvettes of the Cold War